Todd McEwen (born 1953 in California) is an American writer. A graduate of Columbia University, he has been a resident of Scotland since 1981 and is married to novelist Lucy Ellmann. He has published four novels: Fisher's Hornpipe (1983), McX: A Romance of the Dour (1991), Arithmetic (1998) and Who Sleeps with Katz (2003). He has also written for Granta magazine and contributed book reviews to The Guardian and other newspapers. He teaches creative writing at the University of Kent.

External links
Granta site
University of Kent 

1953 births
Living people
Academics of the University of Kent
20th-century American novelists
21st-century American novelists
American male novelists
20th-century American male writers
21st-century American male writers
Columbia University alumni
American emigrants to the United Kingdom